Miami is a town in Roberts County, Texas, United States. It is part of the Pampa, Texas micropolitan statistical area. Its population was 597 at the 2010 census. It is the county seat of Roberts County and the only municipality in the county.

Geography
Miami is located at  (35.693048, −100.638933).

Climate

Demographics

2020 census
Note: the US Census treats Hispanic/Latino as an ethnic category. This table excludes Latinos from the racial categories and assigns them to a separate category. Hispanics/Latinos can be of any race. 

As of the 2020 United States census, there were 539 people, 197 households, and 137 families residing in the city.

2000 census
At the 2000 census, 588 people, 242 households, and 173 families were living in the city. The population density was 504.0 people/sq mi (194.0/km2). There were 283 housing units at an average density of 242.6 per square mile (93.4/km2).  The racial makeup of the city was 95.75% White, 0.85% Native American, 0.17% Asian, 1.53% from other races, and 1.70% from two or more races. Hispanic or Latino of any race were 3.57%.

Of the 242 households, 31.8% had children under the age of 18 living with them, 65.7% were married couples living together, 4.5% had a female householder with no husband present, and 28.1% were not families. About 27.7% of households were one person and 13.2% were one person aged 65 or older. The average household size was 2.43 and the average family size was 2.97.

The age distribution was 26.0% under the age of 18, 5.1% from 18 to 24, 24.1% from 25 to 44, 29.1% from 45 to 64, and 15.6% 65 or older. The median age was 42 years. For every 100 females, there were 95.3 males. For every 100 females age 18 and over, there were 94.2 males.

The median income for a household was $38,875 and for a family was $47,656. Males had a median income of $36,250 versus $22,222 for females. The per capita income for the city was $18,585. About 4.6% of families and 8.8% of the population were below the poverty line, including 9.7% of those under age 18 and 7.5% of those age 65 or over.

Education
Donna Gill is the superintendent Miami Independent School District. Prekindergarten through 12th grade are taught in one building.  Miami High School currently provides Spanish to seven area schools via the Texas Virtual School program.

References

External links

 Miami, Texas
 Miami, Texas from the Handbook of Texas Online

Cities in Texas
Cities in Roberts County, Texas
County seats in Texas
Pampa, Texas micropolitan area